Horeb is an unincorporated community in Jefferson Township, Jackson County, Ohio, United States.

References 

Unincorporated communities in Jackson County, Ohio